Nikolay Breshko-Breshkovsky (also transcribed as Nikolaĭ Brechko-Brechkovskiĭ etc.;  1874, Saint Petersburg — 23/24 August 1943, Berlin) was a Russian writer, a son of the renowned revolutionary Catherine Breshkovsky.

Due to the mother's revolutionary activity Nikolay was raised by relatives. Became a known writer in early 20th century. In 1920, after the Russian Revolution (1917), he emigrated to Warsaw, Poland, but was expelled in 1927 because of conflict with the Sanacja régime. He became a French citizen. During World War II, he collaborated with the Nazi Ministry of Public Enlightenment and Propaganda.

External links 
 
 http://orlabs.oclc.org/identities/np-brechko%20brechkovskii,%20nikolai%20nikolaevitch
 

1874 births
1943 deaths
Writers from Saint Petersburg
People from Sankt-Peterburgsky Uyezd
Writers from the Russian Empire
Polish emigrants to France
French male writers
French collaborators with Nazi Germany
White Russian emigrants to Poland